Kynurenine 3-monooxygenase is an enzyme that in humans is encoded by the KMO gene.

Kynurenine 3-monooxygenase (KMO; EC 1.14.13.9) is an NADPH-dependent flavin monooxygenase that catalyzes the hydroxylation of the L-tryptophan metabolite L-kynurenine to form L-3-hydroxykynurenine.[supplied by OMIM] This is the first step in the degradation of Kyneurinine to Quinolinic acid. This pathway is involved in the activation of cytokine mediated changes in behavior due to inflammatory stimuli such as infections. The KMO gene is upregulated in the lung parenchyma of smokers.

References

Further reading